The Langley Trappers are a junior "B" ice hockey team based in Langley, British Columbia, Canada. They are members of the Harold Brittain Conference of the Pacific Junior Hockey League (PJHL). The Trappers play their home games at the George Preston Recreation Centre, sharing the arena with the Junior "A" Langley Rivermen. Brad Bakken is the team's president and head coach. Brad Bakken is also the general manager.

History

The Trappers joined the league in 2017 as an expansion team, and made the playoffs in their first year under coach Burt Henderson. 

While the Trappers got swept by the Abbotsford Pilots in the first round that year, the lessons learned established the groundwork for success the next year, as Coach Henderson led a core of players to the PJHL Finals in the 2018-19 season. Key performances from goaltender Kristian Lyon, defender Braden Warburton, and forwards Casey Whintors, Keeton Oakley, and Carter Graham led Langley to playoff success, as they beat Abbotsford in 6 games, and beat Delta in 5, before being swept by North Vancouver in the PJHL Finals that year.

Looking to build on their success, the Trappers got to work in the 2019-2020 season, winning the conference in the regular season, but unfortunately were upset in the first round by Mission City in 6 games. The remainder of the playoffs were later shut down due to the COVID-19 pandemic, leaving no champion crowned.

For the 2020-21 season, the Trappers competed in the cohort format against Delta and North Vancouver and held their own until November 2020  when, out of an abundance of caution regarding the COVID Delta variant, the BC government shut down team sports.

Once team sports were re-activated in BC in 2021-22, the Trappers went through organizational changes from both a personnel and coaching standpoint, as a number of core players had either been promoted to Junior A hockey or aged out of Junior Hockey completely, and Coach Burt Henderson and Assistant Coach Thomas Koshman were promoted to head the Langley Rivermen Junior A BCHL team. 

That left the Trappers without a Coach, until GM Brad Bakken stepped in and took the reins of a young rebuilding Hockey club. With help from Assistant Coaches Dylan MacKinlay, Garry Mahesh, and Scott Sparkman, as well as Goalie Coach Joey Ali, Bakken guided the Trappers to their most successful year ever, as the team won both the regular season championship and ultimately the PJHL Championship, defeating Mission City in 5 games, Ridge Meadows in a 4-game sweep, and finally the White Rock Whalers in 5 games to clinch the Stonehouse Cup. While it was a complete team effort, key playoff performances from goaltender Taje Gill, defensemen Ryan Tong and Kyle Graham, and forwards Garrett Whintors, Brendan O'Grady, Jamie Hylands, and Llayton Schearon were prevalent throughout, with forward Anthony Boznijak scoring the Cup-clinching wraparound goal at 19:25 of the 3rd period of Game 5 in front of a sellout crowd at the Lodge at George Preston Arena on Wednesday, March 30th, 2022.

The Trappers went on to represent the PJHL as its reigning champion in the Cyclone Taylor Cup in Delta from April 7th-10th, 2022 at the Ladner Leisure Centre, with fellow PJHL team Delta Ice Hawks serving as tournament host, and with KIJHL Champion Revelstoke Grizzlies and VIJHL Champion Peninsula Panthers completing the final 4 teams competing for Junior B Hockey supremacy. Langley beat Peninsula 6-2 to open the tournament on Thursday, then came back from a 1-0 deficit in the 3rd to beat Revelstoke 3-1 on Friday, before facing the host Ice Hawks in a game to determine home ice advantage on Championship Sunday, as both teams had already clinched spots in the gold medal game with matching undefeated records at that time. Delta won the Saturday game 5-2, however in the end Langley gained revenge for that loss and were crowned champions the next day in the gold medal game on Championship Sunday, as they defeated the Ice Hawks 4-2 to capture their first Cyclone Taylor Cup. Weys and Hylands scored the game winning and insurance goals respectively in the 3rd period.

Season-by-season record

Note: GP = Games played, W = Wins, L = Losses, T = Ties, OTL = Overtime Losses, Pts = Points, GF = Goals for, GA = Goals against

Cyclone Taylor Cup
British Columbia Jr. B Provincial Championships

Current roster

Accurate as of 2019–20 season.

References

External links
Official website of the Langley Trappers

Langley Trappers take PJHL Championship, Aldergrove Star, March 31st, 2022

 Langley Trappers are 2022 Cyclone Taylor Cup Champions, Delta Optimist, April 10th, 2022

Pacific Junior Hockey League teams
Ice hockey teams in British Columbia
Ice hockey clubs established in 2017
2017 establishments in British Columbia